The ITER Neutral Beam Test Facility is a part of the International Thermonuclear Experimental Reactor (ITER) in Padova, Veneto, Italy. The facility will host the full-scale prototype of the reactor's neutral beam injector, MITICA (Megavolt ITer Injector & Concept Advancement), and a smaller prototype of its ion source, SPIDER (Source for the Production of Ions of Deuterium Extracted from a Radio frequency plasma). SPIDER started its operation in June 2018. SPIDER will be used to optimize the ion beam source, to optimize the use of cesium vapor, and to verify the uniformity of the extracted ion beam also during long pulses.

ITER Heating Neutral Beams 

To deliver power to the fusion plasma in ITER, two heating neutral beam injectors will be installed. They are designed to provide the power of 17MW each, through the 23m beamlines, up to the four-meter diameter container:  in order to deposit sufficient heating power in the plasma core instead of the plasma edges, the beam particle energy shall be about 1MeV, thus increasing the neutral beam system complexity to an unprecedented level. This will be the main auxiliary heating system of the reactor. 
Due to its low conversion efficiency, the neutral beam injector first needs to start a precursor negative ion beam of 40A, and then neutralizes it by passing it through a gas cell (with an efficiency <60%), and then by a residual ion dump (the remaining 40—20% negative, 20% positive). 
The neutralized beam is then dumped on a calorimeter during conditioning phases, or coupled with the plasma. Further reionization losses or interception with the mechanical components reduce its current to 17A.

Purposes 

The role of the test facility includes research and development on the following topics:
 voltage holding: due to neutron environment, this will be the first beam source at -1MV with vacuum insulation instead of gas insulation ( gas is typically used);
 negative ion formation: the requirement on the extracted current density from the cesiated ion source is at the limit of the present technology of plasma ion sources. 
 beam optics: the precursor ion beam is generated in a multigrid electrostatic accelerator, having 1280 apertures in each of the 7 grids composing it. Since the overall width of the beam along the beam drift (about 25m) is due to the optics of each of the 1280 beamlets, the grid alignment and the disturbances produced by magnetic fields and electrostatic error fields are to be carefully verified.
 vacuum pumps: two 8m long, 1.6m high cryopumps will be installed on each side of the vacuum vessel. The fatigue life of components operating with cycles between 4K and 400K is to be verified.
 heat load on mechanical components: on the electrodes used for beam acceleration, and along the beam path, mechanical components are subject to very high thermal loads. These loads are continuously applied during long pulses, up to 1h. These loads are anyhow lower than the heat loads expected on the ITER divertor plates.

Prototypes at the NBTF  

SPIDER is the first large experimental devices to start the operation at the test facility (May 2018). The components of MITICA are currently under procurement, with its first operation expected in late 2023.

SPIDER
The design parameters of SPIDER are the following:
 Type: caesiated surface-plasma negative ion source 
 Plasma source: 8 cylindrical RF drivers, operated at 1MHz, connected to a single 0.8m×1.6m×0.25m expansion chamber
 Process gas: hydrogen or deuterium
 Extracted hydrogen negative ion beam current: 54A (target value)
 Electrodes and nominal voltages: Plasma Grid (-110kV), Extraction Grid (-100kV), Grounded Grid (0V)
 Number of beamlets and multi-beamlet beam pattern: 1280 beamlets separated into 4×4 beamlet groups of 5×16 beamlets each
During 2018, the plasma discharge by eight ion source RF drivers were optimised. In 2019 the operation with hydrogen negative ion beam begun: for the first year, SPIDER will operate with a reduced number of beamlets (80 instead of 1280).

Capabilities
The capabilities of SPIDER and MITICA are listed in the following table in comparison with the objectives of the ITER Heating Neutral Beam and with other pre-existing devices.

See also 
 Neutral beam injection
 ITER

References

External links
 Consorzio RFX website
 Page on ITER website

Neutral Beam Test Facility
Particle physics facilities
Science and technology in Italy